The Philippine House Committee on Climate Change is a standing committee of the Philippine House of Representatives.

Jurisdiction 
As prescribed by House Rules, the committee's jurisdiction is on policies and programs to mitigate the impact of climate change to the environment which is characterized by the following:
 Global warming
 Greenhouse effect
 Rising of sea levels
 Shifts in meteorological patterns

Members, 18th Congress

See also 
 House of Representatives of the Philippines
 List of Philippine House of Representatives committees

References

External links 
House of Representatives of the Philippines

Climate Change